Dahabshil Bank International (DBI), also known as the Dahabshil International Commercial Bank, is a bank headquartered in Hargeisa, Somaliland.

Dahabshil Bank International is one of the main banks in Djibouti. It is a subsidiary of DGH Group Dahabshiil.

The bank has access to substantial foreign direct investment from the Persian Gulf region.

History
In early 2014, it became an officially recognized institution in Somaliland. The bank opened its first branch later the same year in Hargeisa, the capital of the country.

As of November 2014, Dahabshil Bank International has issued $70 million in loans earmarked for the local financial, livestock, agriculture, health and education sectors. According to Manager Abdirashid Mohamed Saed, the bank is slated to open additional branches in other parts of Somaliland.

Services
The bank provides business and international banking, as well as personal and private banking to its clients. It also accommodates commodities exchange.

Memberships
Dahabshil Bank international is a member of various international trading agencies and groups, including:
Common Market for Eastern and Southern Africa
Multilateral Investment Guarantee Agency

See also
List of banks in Somaliland
Al Gamil

References

External links 

 

Economy of Djibouti
Companies of Djibouti
Banks of Djibouti
Companies based in Hargeisa
Economy of Somaliland
2014 establishments in Somalia
Banks established in 2014
Companies of Somaliland
Banks of Somaliland